Appleby-in-Westmorland is a civil parish in the Eden District, Cumbria, England. It contains 144 buildings that are recorded in the National Heritage List for England. Of these, six are listed at Grade I, the highest of the three grades, eleven are at Grade II*, the middle grade, and the others are at Grade II, the lowest grade. The parish contains the market town of Appleby (renamed Appleby-in-Westmorland in 1974) and surrounding countryside. There is a great variety of types of listed building in the parish. The most important building is Appleby Castle; this and a number of associated structures are listed. Most of the listed buildings are houses and associated structures, shops and public buildings. Other listed buildings include churches, public houses, hotels, two crosses and a lamp post, farmhouses and farm buildings, former industrial buildings, schools, banks, a bridge, railway station buildings, a length of wall containing inscribed stones, a milestone, and three war memorials.


Key

Buildings

Notes and references

Notes

Citations

Sources

Lists of listed buildings in Cumbria
Listed